Absolute may refer to:

Companies
 Absolute Entertainment, a video game publisher
 Absolute Radio, (formerly Virgin Radio), independent national radio station in the UK
 Absolute Software Corporation, specializes in security and data risk management
 Absolut Vodka, a brand of Swedish vodka

Mathematics and science
 Absolute (geometry), the quadric at infinity
 Absolute (perfumery), a fragrance substance produced by solvent extraction
 Absolute magnitude, the brightness of a star
 Absolute value, a notion in mathematics, commonly a number's numerical value without regard to its sign
 Absolute pressure, the pressure in a fluid, measured relative to a vacuum
Absolute temperature, a temperature on the thermodynamic temperature scale
 Absolute zero, the lower limit of the thermodynamic temperature scale, -273.15 °C
 Absoluteness in mathematical logic

Music
 Absolute (production team), a British music writing and production team
 Absolute (record compilation), a brand of compilation albums from EVA Records
 Absolute (Aion album), 1994
 Absolute (Time-Life album), an R&B compilation, 2003
 The Absolute (album), by Ace Augustine, 2011
 Absolute, an album by Kublai Khan, 2019
 Absolute, an album by the Scientists, 1991
 "Absolute", a song by The Fray from The Fray, 2009
 Absolute (song), a 1985 song by Scritti Politti

Politics and law
 Absolute defence, a factual circumstance or argument that, if proven, will end the litigation in favor of the defendant
 Absolute liability, a standard of legal liability found in tort and criminal law of various legal jurisdictions
 Absolute monarchy, a monarchical form of government in which the monarch's powers are not limited by a constitution or by the law
 Absolute majority, a majority of the membership of a group

Philosophy and theology
 Georg Wilhelm Friedrich Hegel#Absolute spirit, a concept in philosophy
Absolute idealism

Other
 Absolute construction, a grammatical construction used in certain languages
 Absolute Manage, a systems lifecycle management software suite
 The Absolute (novel), a book in the Animorphs series
 DC Comics Absolute Edition, a line of high-end comic book reprints
 Absolute Press, an imprint of Bloomsbury Publishing

See also 

Taiji (philosophy)
Hermeticism#God as 'the All'
 Absolutely (disambiguation)
 Absolution (disambiguation)
 Absolutism (disambiguation)